Yekaterina Kupina (born 2 February 1986) is a Russian middle-distance runner. She competed in the 800 metres event at the 2014 IAAF World Indoor Championships.

References

1986 births
Living people
Russian female middle-distance runners
Universiade medalists in athletics (track and field)
Place of birth missing (living people)
Universiade silver medalists for Russia